Portrait of Suzanne Valadon is an 1885 painting by Henri de Toulouse-Lautrec now held at the Museo Nacional de Bellas Artes in Buenos Aires. Toulouse-Lautrec and the artist and model Suzanne Valadon were friends in Montmartre in Paris.

References

1885 paintings
Paintings by Henri de Toulouse-Lautrec
Suzanne Valadon
Paintings in Argentina